Çiftlik is a village in the Karkamış District, Gaziantep Province, Turkey. The village had a population of 551 in 2022 and is inhabited by Turkmens of the Barak and Elbegli tribes.

References

Villages in Karkamış District